You Xiaodi was the defending champion but chose not to participate.

Rebecca Peterson won the title, defeating Elvina Kalieva in the final, 6–4, 6–0.

Seeds

Draw

Finals

Top half

Bottom half

References

Main Draw

Rancho Santa Fe Open - Singles